East Sussex (formally the Eastern division of Sussex) was a parliamentary constituency in the county of Sussex, which returned two Members of Parliament to the House of Commons of the Parliament of the United Kingdom, elected by the bloc vote system.

It was created under the Great Reform Act for the 1832 general election, when the existing Sussex constituency was divided into two. It consisted of the rapes of Lewes, Pevensey  and Hastings, an area broadly similar to but not identical with the modern county of East Sussex. The "place of election", where nominations were taken and the result declared, was Lewes.

East Sussex was abolished for the 1885 general election, being divided between four new single-member county constituencies, Rye, Eastbourne, East Grinstead and Lewes. (Lewes and Rye also absorbed the voters from the abolished boroughs of the same names.)

Boundaries
1832–1885: The Rapes of Lewes, Hastings and Pevensey.

Members of Parliament

Election results

Elections in the 1830s

Elections in the 1840s

 
 

Darby resigned after being appointed a Commissioner of Inclosures, causing a by-election.

Elections in the 1850s

 
 

Frewen resigned by accepting the office of Steward of the Chiltern Hundreds, causing a by-election.

Elections in the 1860s

Elections in the 1870s

Elections in the 1880s

References 

F W S Craig, British Parliamentary Election Results 1832-1885 (2nd edition, Aldershot: Parliamentary Research Services, 1989)

Politics of East Sussex
Parliamentary constituencies in South East England (historic)
Constituencies of the Parliament of the United Kingdom established in 1832
Constituencies of the Parliament of the United Kingdom disestablished in 1885